The year 667 BC was a year of the pre-Julian Roman calendar. In the Roman Empire, it was known as year 87 Ab urbe condita . The denomination 667 BC for this year has been used since the early medieval period, when the Anno Domini calendar era became the prevalent method in Europe for naming years.

Events

By place

Middle East 

 King Ashurbanipal of Assyria resumes his late father's attack on Egypt (see 671 BC), recapturing Memphis and beginning an offensive into Upper Egypt.

Asia Minor 

 Byzantium (modern Istanbul) is founded by Megaran colonists under Byzas.

Births

Deaths

References

 
660s BC